Earl Painter may refer to:

 Earl H. Painter (1888–1969), American college football player and coach at Saint Louis University, lawyer for Southwestern Bell Telephone Company
 Erle V. Painter (1881–1968), American chiropractor and athletic trainer for the Boston Braves (1929) and New York Yankees (1930–1942)